The Witherspoon Street School for Colored Children educated the African-American children of Princeton, New Jersey from 1858 until the Princeton Public Schools were integrated in 1948.  The school was originally located at the building still standing at 184 Witherspoon Street.  As enrollment increased it moved, in 1909, to 35 Quarry Street, the building which bears the National Register of Historic Places designation.  The Quarry Street building was expanded in 1939 and again in 1966, giving it its present appearance.  The former school has since been turned into an apartment building.

In 1948 the Journal of Negro Education wrote that the Witherspoon Street School had empty spaces while the school for white children was overcrowded.

Gallery

See also
National Register of Historic Places listings in Mercer County, New Jersey

References

National Register of Historic Places in Mercer County, New Jersey
Schools in Princeton, New Jersey
Public elementary schools in New Jersey
Buildings and structures in Princeton, New Jersey
New Jersey Register of Historic Places